Shadehill Recreation Area is a state recreation area in South Dakota located around the Shadehill Reservoir in Perkins County. The recreation area is administered by the South Dakota Department of Game, Fish, and Parks. It covers 2,287 acres and offers campgrounds, beaches, access for boating, fishing and other water activities.

See also
List of South Dakota state parks

References

External links 
 Shadehill Recreation Area - South Dakota Dept. of Game, Fish & Parks

State parks of South Dakota
Perkins County, South Dakota
1952 establishments in South Dakota